The 2016 Indiana gubernatorial election was held on November 8, 2016, to elect the governor and lieutenant governor of Indiana, concurrently with the 2016 U.S. presidential election as well as elections to the United States Senate and elections to the United States House of Representatives and various state and local elections. The primaries were held on May 3, 2016. Republican Lieutenant Governor Eric Holcomb won the race with 51.4% of the vote.

Incumbent Republican Governor Mike Pence was running for reelection to a second term in office until July 15, 2016, when Republican presidential nominee Donald Trump selected Pence as his vice presidential running mate. As Pence was barred by Indiana law from simultaneously running for both offices, he subsequently withdrew from the gubernatorial election. Pence went on to become Vice President of the United States. He was replaced on the ballot for Governor by his former running mate, incumbent Lieutenant Governor Eric Holcomb, who was selected by the Indiana Republican State Committee as the nominee on July 26, 2016. Holcomb later selected State Auditor Suzanne Crouch on August 1, 2016, to be his running mate as the nomination for Lieutenant Governor was made vacant by the decision of Holcomb to seek the gubernatorial nomination; she was confirmed at a subsequent meeting of the Indiana Republican State Committee later that day.

John Gregg, the former Speaker of the Indiana House of Representatives, was the Democratic nominee. Gregg previously ran for Governor in 2012, but was defeated by Pence.

Republican primary

Candidates

Declared
 Mike Pence, incumbent Governor (withdrew after primary to run for Vice President of the United States as the running mate of Donald Trump)

Declined
 Greg Ballard, former Mayor of Indianapolis
 Susan Brooks, U.S. Representative and former United States Attorney for the Southern District of Indiana (ran for re-election)
 Luke Messer, U.S. Representative (ran for re-election)
 Todd Young, U.S. Representative (ran for the U.S. Senate)

Results

Republican State Committee selection
On July 15, 2016, Donald Trump announced that Pence would be his running mate as vice president in the 2016 presidential election. Under Indiana law, Pence was unable to run for both governor and vice president simultaneously; he therefore withdrew from the gubernatorial election, creating a vacancy on the Republican ticket. On July 26, the chairman of the Indiana Republican Party, Jeff Cardwell, announced that Eric Holcomb had been nominated by the Indiana Republican State Committee to replace Pence on the ballot for Governor. The vote totals were not released. Holcomb later selected Suzanne Crouch on August 1, 2016, to be his running mate as the nomination for Lieutenant Governor was made vacant by the decision of Holcomb to seek the gubernatorial nomination; she was then confirmed by the Committee at a meeting later that day.

Candidates

Declared
 Susan Brooks, U.S. Representative and former United States Attorney for the Southern District of Indiana
 Eric Holcomb, Lieutenant Governor of Indiana
 Running mate: Suzanne Crouch, Indiana State Auditor
 Todd Rokita, U.S. Representative and former Indiana Secretary of State
 Jim Tomes, state senator

Declined
 Brian Bosma, Speaker of the Indiana House of Representatives
 Mitch Daniels, former governor of Indiana
 Lloyd Winnecke, Mayor of Evansville

Democratic primary

Candidates

Declared
 John R. Gregg, former Speaker of the Indiana House of Representatives and nominee for Governor in 2012
Running mate: Christina Hale, state representative

Withdrawn
 Glenda Ritz, Indiana Superintendent of Public Instruction (subsequently ran for re-election)
 Karen Tallian, state senator

Declined
 Evan Bayh, former U.S. Senator and former Governor of Indiana (ran for the U.S. Senate) 
 Pete Buttigieg, Mayor of South Bend
 Greg Goodnight, Mayor of Kokomo
 Baron Hill, former U.S. Representative and nominee for the U.S. Senate in 1990
 Scott Pelath, Minority Leader of the Indiana House of Representatives
 Tony Roswarski, Mayor of Lafayette
 Tom Sugar, vice president of Complete College America and former aide to Evan Bayh

Endorsements

Results

Libertarian Party convention

Candidates

Declared
 Rex Bell, businessman
Jim Wallace

Nominated
 Rex Bell, businessman
Running mate: Karl Tatgenhorst

General election

Candidates

Democratic: John R. Gregg, former Speaker of the Indiana House of Representatives and nominee for Governor in 2012
Running mate: Christina Hale, state representative
Libertarian: Rex Bell, businessman
Running mate: Karl Tatgenhorst
Republican: Eric Holcomb, Lieutenant Governor of Indiana
Running mate: Suzanne Crouch, Indiana State Auditor

Debates
Complete video of debate, September 27, 2016 - C-SPAN
Complete video of debate, October 3, 2016 - C-SPAN
Complete video of debate, October 25, 2016 - C-SPAN

Predictions

Polling 
Aggregate polls

Graphical summary

with Mike Pence

with Susan Brooks

with Todd Rokita

with Baron Hill

with Glenda Ritz

Results
Holcomb won with 51.4% of the votes, Gregg taking 45.4%, and Libertarian Rex Bell finishing with 3.2%.

Notes

References

External links
Official campaign websites (Archived)
 Eric Holcomb (R) for Governor
 John Gregg (D) for Governor
 Rex Bell (L) for Governor

2016
Governor
Indiana
Mike Pence